The Nationwide League is a domestic Kenyan rugby union competition. Full members of the Kenya Rugby Union that do not participate in the top tier Kenya Cup are entitled to participate in the league. It operates in a system of promotion and relegation with the Kenya Cup. Matches are played on Saturday afternoons, usually before fixtures in the Kenya Cup.

For the 2015-16 tournament, sixty four competing teams are divided into seven regional pools in a single round-robin league with the top teams proceeding to a knock-out competition. Six teams will earn promotion to a newly formulated Kenya Cup 2 tournament

After the round of fixtures played on 6 February 2016, eight teams were withdrawn for failure to honor matches

2016-2017 Teams

Nairobi Region

Pool A(Universities) 
 Technical University of Kenya
 United States University - Africa
 Africa Nazarene University
 Daystar University
 KCA University
 Mount Kenya University - Nairobi
 Multimedia University of Kenya
 Kenya Methodist University - Nairobi
 Co-operative University College Kenya
 Nairobi Aviators

Pool B(Clubs) 
 Mwamba III
 Community Rugby Association(Comras)
 Masaku RFC
 Stormers RFC
 Brumbies RFC
 Machakos RFC
 Makueni RFC
 Dagoretti Bulldogs
 Ngong RFC
 Eastlanders RFC
 Northern Suburb Cubs

Western Region

Pool A 
 Siaya RFC
 Maseno University
 Homa Bay RFC
 Mbale RFC
 Christ is the answer ministries - Kisumu(CITAM)

Pool B 
 Bungoma RFC
 Shieywe
 Masinde Muliro University
 Webuye RFC
 Mount Kenya University - Kakamega
 Kakamega RFC
 Kakamega Welfare

Rift Valley Region

Pool A 
 Kitale RFC
 Koisagat
 Eldoret RFC
 Eldoret Falcons
 KPA Eldoret

Pool B 
 Molo RFC
 Egerton University
 Menengai Oilers
 Kericho RFC
 Kabarak University
 Nakuru KITI

Coast Region 
 Spartans RC
 Technical University of Mombasa Marines
 Taita Taveta University
 Shepherds RFC
 Malindi RFC
 Coast Raiders
 Pwani Sharks RC
 Shoxxs RFC Taita

Central Region 
 Mount Kenya University - Thika
 Kiambu RFC
 Dedan Kimathi University
 Embu RFC
 Chuka Vikings
 Murang'a RFC
 Karatina University
 Zetech Rugby
 Nanyuki Jackals

Champions

References

Rugby union competitions in Kenya
Kenya
Rugby union